Miguel Fuentes may refer to:

 Miguel Fuentes (baseball) (1946–1970), Puerto Rican baseball pitcher
 Miguel Fuentes (rower) (born 1947), Mexican rower
 Miguel Fuentes (Spanish footballer) (born 1964), Spanish football defender and chairman
 Miguel Fuentes (Mexican footballer) (born 1971), Mexican football goalkeeper and manager

See also
 Miguel Ydígoras Fuentes (1895–1982), president of Guatemala